The Uniden LPGA Invitational was a golf tournament on the LPGA Tour from 1984 to 1986. It was played at the Mesa Verde Country Club in Costa Mesa, California.

Winners
1986 Mary Beth Zimmerman
1985 Bonnie Lauer
1984 Nancy Lopez

References

External links
Mesa Verde Country Club

Former LPGA Tour events
Golf in California
Sports in Costa Mesa, California
Women's sports in California